Mykhaylo Shyshka (Ukrainian: Михайло Олегович Шишка; born 5 July 1994) is a Ukrainian footballer.

References

External links
 

Living people
1994 births
Ukrainian footballers
Association football midfielders
Ukrainian expatriate footballers
Ukrainian Premier League players
Ukrainian First League players
Ukrainian Second League players
FC Shakhtar-3 Donetsk players
FK Riteriai players
FC Obolon-Brovar Kyiv players
FC Dinamo Tbilisi players
FC Samtredia players
FC Inhulets Petrove players
FC Lviv players
Ukrainian expatriate sportspeople in Lithuania
Ukrainian expatriate sportspeople in Georgia (country)
Expatriate footballers in Lithuania
Expatriate footballers in Georgia (country)
Ukraine youth international footballers
Ukraine under-21 international footballers
Sportspeople from Lviv Oblast